Abbasabad (also Romanized as ‘Abbāsābād) is a village in Bakan Rural District, Hasanabad District, Eqlid County, Fars Province, Iran. At the 2006 census, its population was 315, in 69 families.

References 

Populated places in Eqlid County